Poulton-le-Fylde is a market town in the Wyre district of Lancashire, England, situated on a coastal plain called the Fylde. There are 16 buildings and structures in the town which have been listed by the Secretary of State for Culture, Olympics, Media and Sport as being of special architectural, historical or cultural significance. One is classified as Grade II*, and the rest as Grade II; Poulton-le-Fylde has no Grade I listed buildings. The Grade II* designation is for St Chad's Church. There is written evidence of a church on the site since 1094, although it may have been built earlier. It became the Anglican parish church at the time of the Reformation and was largely rebuilt in the 18th century.

Of the remaining listed buildings and structures, nine are in or very close to Market Place in the centre of town. They include three former houses (all now shops), a former bank, a telephone kiosk and four stone market place structures. Three cottages, a house and the former Roman Catholic Chapel of St John, are situated within two miles of the town centre. The ages of the listed buildings and structures range from the market cross, probably built in the 17th century, to the telephone kiosk, built in the 1930s.

In the United Kingdom, the term "listed building" refers to a building or other structure officially designated as being of special architectural, historical or cultural significance. These buildings are in three grades: Grade I consists of buildings of outstanding architectural or historical interest; Grade II* includes particularly significant buildings of more than local interest; Grade II consists of buildings of special architectural or historical interest. Buildings in England are listed on recommendations provided by English Heritage, which also determines the grading.

Listed buildings and structures

References
Footnotes

Bibliography

External links

Lists of listed buildings in Lancashire